Turbonilla tupinamba is a species of sea snail, a marine gastropod mollusk in the family Pyramidellidae, the pyrams and their allies.

Distribution
This species occurs in the Atlantic Ocean off Brazil.

References

 Pimenta A.D. & Absalão R.S. (2002). On the taxonomy of Turbonilla puncta (C. B. Adams, 1850) (Gastropoda, Pyramidellidae), with the description of a new species from Brazil and remarks on other Western Atlantic species. Zootaxa. 78: 1-16

External links
 To Encyclopedia of Life
 To World Register of Marine Species

tupinamba
Gastropods described in 2002